Count Gilbert de Chambrun (1909–2009) was a French politician. He was a member of the French Resistance and he served in the National Assembly.

Early life
Gilbert de Chambrun was born on 2 November 1909 in Paris, France. His father, Pierre de Chambrun, was a politician. He was a descendant of Agrippa d'Aubigné and Gilbert du Motier, Marquis de Lafayette, and he was raised as a Calvinist.

De Chambrun was educated at the Lycée Janson de Sailly. He graduated with a bachelor's degree in Laws from the University of Paris, and he received another degree from Sciences Po.

Career
Chambrun joined the French Foreign Service in 1934, serving at the French embassy in Rome until 1938. During World War II, he served in the French Army from 1939 to 1941. He joined Combat, a group within the French resistance in 1942, and he served as a leader until 1944. At the end of the war, he returned to the French Army, where he served under General Jean de Lattre de Tassigny.

De Chambrun served as a member of the National Assembly from 1945 to 1955, representing Lozère. He was opposed to the First Indochina War as well as the establishment of the European Coal and Steel Community, the European Defence Community, and NATO. He was the vice president of the Mouvement pour la paix, a non-profit organization which promoted nuclear disarmament.

De Chambrun resumed his position in the Foreign Service in 1956. Meanwhile, he also served as the mayor of Marvejols from 1953 to 1965, and again from 1971 to 1983. He  was a Commander of the Legion of Honour and the National Order of Merit. He was a recipient of the Croix de guerre and the Resistance Medal for his World War II service.

De Chambrun published his memoir as well as a novel and several plays.

Personal life and death
De Chambrun married Jacqueline Retourné, a paediatrician whom he met in the Maquis du Mont Mouchet. They had four children. He died on 22 December 2009 in Marvejols, Lozère, France. He was 100 years old.

Works

References

1909 births
2009 deaths
Politicians from Paris
French Calvinist and Reformed Christians
Union progressiste politicians
Members of the Constituent Assembly of France (1945)
Members of the Constituent Assembly of France (1946)
Deputies of the 1st National Assembly of the French Fourth Republic
Deputies of the 2nd National Assembly of the French Fourth Republic
Mayors of places in Occitania (administrative region)
French anti–nuclear weapons activists
French novelists
20th-century French dramatists and playwrights
University of Paris alumni
Sciences Po alumni
French military personnel of World War II
French Resistance members
Commandeurs of the Légion d'honneur
Commanders of the Ordre national du Mérite
Recipients of the Croix de Guerre 1939–1945 (France)
French centenarians
Men centenarians
20th-century French memoirists